Shatian is a town located in Fengshun County, Guangdong Province, China.

See also 
List of township-level divisions of Guangdong

References

External links 
Official website of the Fengshun County Government

Towns in Guangdong

Fengshun County